Camp Orange: The Mystery of Spaghetti Creek is the name of the third season of the children's reality series Camp Orange. It was aired on Nickelodeon Australia in May 2007. The filming location was at Old Mogo Gold Rush Town in Mogo NSW. After the previous season, Total Perception lost the rights to Camp Orange, with Fox World Australia taking over production.

Contestants

Week 1
It began with Maude tied to a pole, screaming for help. Two bushrangers informed the teams to "Save the girl, and watch yourselves!". Once Maude was untied, she then informed the teams they had to travel back in time to 1852, where Captain Thunderbox had successfully driven out the townspoke of Spaghetti Creek and now is out to claim the hidden treasure.

Lock, Shock and One Soaking Barrel
In this challenge all teams were locked in a mini jail cell, and they had to make a long wooden pole and retrieve the keys. They had 2 minutes to retrieve the keys, and if they get the right one they will get out, but if they don't they will get soaked.
 1st: Dark Evil Bunnies
 Soaked: Booty Kickers, Bee's Knees and Mix Ups

Blind Man's Bash
In Blind Man's Bash one teammate is wearing a chest guard and a bucket helmet. They are told where to go by the other teammate (who is at the sidelines) and the teammate wearing the gear has to pick up as many horse shoes as they can.
 1st: Booty Kickers
 2nd: Dark Evil Bunnies
 3rd: Mix Ups
 3rd: Bee's Knees

Week 2

Tied Up and Pied Up
The teams are tied together for a messy race around the town, collecting the ingredients for Maude's favorite, apple pie, along the way. The winners are the first to cross the line in spaghetti-filled boots with all their ingredients intact. It was a very close match but the Bee's Knees pulled ahead of the Bunnies, winning the challenge.
 1st Bee's Knees
 2nd Dark Evil Bunnies
 3rd Mix Ups
 4th Booty Kickers

Slippery Log Bog
A slippery log is suspended over a muddy bog. One member from each team must try to make it to the middle and claim the signal flag whilst being pelted from the sidelines with wet sponges. The team which claims the flag in the final wins.

Round 1: Bee's Knees vs Booty Kickers

Round 2: Mix Ups vs Dark Evil Bunnies

Grand Final: Bee's Knees vs Dark Evil Bunnies

Winners: Bee's Knees

Week 3

Filthy Rich
When Captain Thunderbox has disappeared for a while the town goes back to gold mining. The campers must dig and sift through dirt to find little pieces of gold, wash them, dry them and put on the scales. The winner was the team that tipped the scales first.
 1st Mix Ups
 2nd Bee's Knees
 3rd Booty Kickers
 4th Dark Evil Bunnies

Photo Finish
The teams must race to be the fastest in getting changed into 3 outfits, husband and wife, show girls, and police and convict; photos must be taken of each outfit. The fastest two times were 8 min 31 seconds for the Bee's Knees, and 8 min and 8 sec for the Booty Kickers.
 1st Booty Kickers
 2nd Bee's Knees
 3rd Mix Ups
 4th Dark Evil Bunnies

Week 4

Slime Bucket 
The teams must keep a bucket of Snakey Slime up in the air with a pole or be drenched in it. The teams must have one change over. Whoever holds the slime in the air the longest wins.
 1st Dark Evil Bunnies
 2nd Bee's Knees
 3rd Booty Kickers
 4th Mix Ups

Dr Zeke's Snake Bite Remedy
Teams must race to fill a billy can with holes with water then race to their tube of 'medicine' and add water till a cork reaches the top. Once totally full a vial is to be filled and run to the finish line.
 1st Bee's Knees
 2nd Dark Evil Bunnies
 3rd Mix Ups
 4th Booty Kickers

Week 5

Billy Can Jam 
Each team had to make a song/rap/poem in 15 mins using at least 4 of the following words: spaghetti, Maude, Thunderbox, slime, snake, camp, bucket, Nick, etc. Each team was allowed one percussion instrument to go with their creation. Once every team had presented their piece the teams had to vote for who they wanted to win, and they were not allowed to vote for themselves.
 1st Mix Ups (2 votes)
 2nd Dark Evil Bunnies (1 vote)
 2nd Bee's Knees (1 vote)
 3rd Booty Kickers (0 votes)

Raiders in the Dark
One member from each team must make their way into the pitch black mine shaft to retrieve a series of left-behind items. They are attached by a rope to their teammate outside who is talking them through the challenge. Not for the faint-hearted! Fastest time wins.

 1st Dark Evil Bunnies
 2nd Bee's Knees
 Did not complete: Mix Ups, Booty Kickers

Week 6

The Treasure Hunt
The treasure hunt began at the Spaghetti Creek swamp where each team must look for their coloured tiles. When Harry picked up the Booty Kickers' tile he quickly dropped it and covered it up. The Booty Kickers saw this and pulled ahead.

The Bee's Knees were right behind the Booty Kickers when they went to the next station. They find the right tile at the bottom of a haystack. When the Dark Evil Bunnies and Mix Ups finally find their tiles the Booty Kickers go on towards the mine.

The Booty Kickers took quite a bit of time figuring out the clue so the Dark Evil Bunnies and Bee's Knees caught up to the Booty Kickers and they all run to the mine together. In the tunnel the Booty Kickers find their tile first and run ahead to figure out a jigsaw puzzle.

Bee's Knees and Dark Evil Bunnies catch up and they all go in different directions for their next tile. The Booty Kickers went to the wash house, the Dark Evil Bunnies went to the blacksmith's building.

The Booty Kickers are still ahead. They eat through many pies and find another much-needed tile. They go on ahead while the Dark Evil Bunnies and Bee's Knees eat their pies. The Mix Ups finally come to put their puzzle together which leads them to the post office, while the Booty Kickers use a pole to knock down a flour bucket and acquire another tile.

The Booty Kickers waste time trying to figure out what to do with the letters leaving the Dark Evil Bunnies to knock down their own bucket and pull ahead. The Dark Evil Bunnies go to the graveyard and use their tiles to figure out which grave to dig up. In short order, the Booty Kickers and Bee's Knees do the same thing.

The Dark Evil Bunnies uncover a small chest in which they get their last clue, a key and a map. They sit down to work it out while the Booty Kickers take off to where they think the treasure is. It was down to the Bee's Knees and Dark Evil Bunnies. (The Mix Ups were up to the pies.) The Bee's Knees run to where they think the treasure is hidden. Ryan figures out that if you fold the map, the track line becomes a coffin shape; with that they run to Mayor Freddy Spaghetti's coffin and unlock it to find the treasure.

Ranks/winners
Most Key Amount Winner

 1st Dark Evil Bunnies 13 keys
 2nd Bee's Knees 12 keys
 3rd Mix Ups 9 keys
 3rd Booty Kickers 9 keys

Ranking

 1st Place: Dark Evil Bunnies
 2nd Place: Bee's Knees
 3rd Place: Mix Ups
 3rd Place: Booty Kickers

Prizes
The Dark Evil Bunnies
 New Super Bikes
 Orange iPod shuffles
 PlayStation 3
 2 steering wheels
 Collection of Best Games
 Billabong Gear
 Bop It Extreme 2

Runner Up Prizes for Bee's Knees, Mix Ups, and Booty Kickers
 PlayStation 2
 Billabong Gear
 Orange iPod shuffles

2000s Australian reality television series
Nickelodeon (Australia and New Zealand) original programming
2007 Australian television series debuts
2007 Australian television series endings